Ranchito de Santa Fe was a  Mexican land grant that lies in the present day, partially within the southern bounds of the city of San Luis Obispo, the balance lies east of U.S. Route 101 in San Luis Obispo County, California.

History 
Ranchito de Santa Fe was granted on September 18th, 1842 by Governor Juan Alvarado to Victor Linares.  Victor Linares, made a claim for 1,000 varas square, in San Luis Obispo County, on February 12, 1852 and it was confirmed by the commission March 14th, 1853, by the district court January 14th, 1857.  An appeal was dismissed June 3, 1859.  The Ranchito was located along San Luis Creek, south of the Mission lands and on the road between the Mission and the port of San Luis Obispo.  It shared a common boundary with the Mission lands of the Rancho La Laguna on the west.

See also

List of Ranchos of California

References

Ranchito de Santa Fe
Ranchito de Santa Fe

Ranchito de Santa Fe